In enzymology, a dimethylallylcistransferase is an enzyme that catalyzes the chemical reaction

dimethylallyl diphosphate + isopentenyl diphosphate  diphosphate + neryl diphosphate

Thus, the two substrates of this enzyme are dimethylallyl diphosphate and isopentenyl diphosphate, whereas its two products are diphosphate and neryl diphosphate.

This enzyme belongs to the family of transferases, specifically those transferring aryl or alkyl groups other than methyl groups.  The systematic name of this enzyme class is dimethylallyl-diphosphate:isopentenyl-diphosphate dimethylallylcistransferase. This enzyme is also called neryl-diphosphate synthase.

References 

 
 

EC 2.5.1
Enzymes of unknown structure